Calamagrostis bolanderi is a species of grass known by the common name Bolander's reedgrass. It is endemic to northern California, where it grows in moist coastal habitat such as temperate coniferous forest, wet meadows and bogs, and coastal scrub.

Description
This is a perennial grass growing to heights between 0.5 and 1.5 meters, each erect stem generally with four nodes. It has flat leaves and open, spreading inflorescences of very small spikelets. Each spikelet is made up of one floret surrounded by a v-shaped pair of smooth bracts.

References

External links
Jepson Manual Treatment
USDA Plants Profile
Photo gallery

bolanderi
Endemic flora of California
Native grasses of California
Grasses of the United States